Las Nieves, (Spanish for "The Snows"), officially the Municipality of Las Nieves,  is a 2nd class municipality in the province of Agusan del Norte, Philippines. According to the 2020 census, it has a population of 30,240 people.

History 
On 27 March 2021, over 304 NPA militiamen and supporters of the New People's Army surrendered at Las Nieves in Barangay Ibuan to the Philippine Government, dismantling the rebels' key support in the area.

Geography
According to the Philippine Statistics Authority, the municipality has a land area of  constituting  of the  total area of Agusan del Norte.

Las Nieves is bounded by Butuan and Buenavista, Agusan del Norte to the north, municipality of Sibagat, Agusan del Sur to the northeast, Bayugan to the east, municipality of Esperanza, Agusan del Sur to the south and municipality of Claveria, Misamis Oriental to the west.

Climate

Barangays
Las Nieves is politically subdivided into 20 barangays. Barangay Casiklan was created in 2000.

Demographics

In the 2020 census, Las Nieves had a population of 30,240.

Economy

References

External links
 [ Philippine Standard Geographic Code]

Municipalities of Agusan del Norte